Manuel María Orellana Contreras (17 December 1870 in El Jícaro, Guatemala – 17 June 1940 in Barcelona, Spain) was a Guatemalan army officer and politician, and from 17 to 31 December 1930, de facto interim President of Guatemala, after leading a coup d'état that ended Baudilio Palma interim presidency.  Palma, in turn, had been appointed president only four days earlier, when president Lázaro Chacón González suffered a stroke and was forced to resign. At the moment the coup took place, Orellana Contreras was commander of the San Rafael de Matamoros Fort in Guatemala City.

Coup d'état against Baudilio Palma 

In December, 1930 the following events occurred in a rapid succession:
 On 12 December, General Chacón suffers a stroke that forces him to resign.
 General Mauro de León, first designated successor to the Presidency apparently resigns.
 Lawyer and cabinet member Baudilio Palma, second designated successor, is appointed interim President.

However, on 16 December 1930 a coup d'état led by general Orellana Contreras and Luis Leonardo forced Palma to resign after a short battle inside the Presidential Palace. During the fight, that lasted no more than an hour, both Palma and Mauro de León died. The Liberal Progresista party placed general Roderico Anzueto in the key position of Chief of Police.

Presidency 

Once in power, Orellana Contreras reformed the Cabinet and worked on restructuring the Guatemalan military bases.  However, given the large investments that American companies had in Guatemala -especially the United Fruit Company, the United States Secretary of State Henry Stimson publicly denounced Orellana as an unconstitutional leader and demanded his removal. Realizing that the Americans would not recognize his government, Orellana resigned on December 29.  Stimson sent Ambassador Sheltom Whitehouse to tell Orellana Contreras that his country would not be dealing with the new Guatemalan president whatsoever. Whitehouse pressed the National Assembly to force Orellana Contreras to resign, taking advantage of Orellana's lack of political experience. and the American government needed a (USA loyal)stable regime in Guatemala.

After leaving power 

Orellana Contreras was cousin of former president general José María Orellana Pinto, who had been president Manuel Estrada Cabrera Chief of Staff and who had appointed general Jorge Ubico as chief of his secret police while in office. In attention to this, new president Ubico commissioned Orellana Contreras as military attaché in the Guatemalan Ambassy in Spain, where he worked until his death on 17 June 1940.

See also 
 
 
 
 Baudilio Palma
 Jorge Ubico
 José María Orellana
 Lázaro Chacón
 United Fruit Company

Notes

References

Bibliography 

 
 
 
 
 
 
 
 
 
 

1870 births
1940 deaths
People from El Progreso Department
Guatemalan people of Spanish descent
Presidents of Guatemala
Guatemalan generals
United Fruit Company
Leaders who took power by coup